Dance of the Vampires is a musical remake of the 1967 Roman Polanski film of the same name (known as The Fearless Vampire Killers in the USA). Polanski also directed this musical’s original German-language production (titled ). The music was composed by Jim Steinman, orchestrated by Steve Margoshes, and Michael Kunze wrote the original German book and lyrics.

Plot
Note: This synopsis applies to the European and Japanese productions only. The Broadway version was heavily rewritten. In addition, portions of this synopsis may reflect later changes to the European show, which will become clear when reading the song list below.

Act I
Sometime in the late 19th century, Professor Abronsius and Alfred, his bumbling young assistant, arrive in a small Jewish shtetl somewhere in the Carpathians, where they hope to prove the professor's theory that vampires exist. Nearly freezing to death in the nearby woods (He, Ho, He), the two are taken in by Chagal, an innkeeper who spends most of his free time lusting after Magda, his beautiful chambermaid, much to the disdain of his long-suffering wife, Rebecca (Knoblauch – "Garlic"). The professor, upon noticing the countless strings of garlic hung about the place and around people's necks, is overjoyed, confident of the nearness of his goal, and immediately starts probing Chagal for information. The villagers, evidently frightened, pretend to be completely oblivious, silencing the local fool, who still manages to blurt something about the castle and the count that lives there. 
After exploring the rooms upstairs in which they are staying (Bitte, meine Herren – "Please, Gentlemen"), Alfred discovers and is smitten by Chagal's beautiful seventeen-year-old daughter, Sarah. Chagal is very protective of his child, going as far as boarding up her room so she wouldn't bathe around the two guests (Eine schöne Tochter ist ein Segen – "A Beautiful Daughter is a Blessing"). That night, Alfred and Sarah sing of their mutual attraction, while Chagal tries to coerce his way into Magda's bed and Abronsius is swiftly knocked on the head by Chagal's wife (Nie geseh'n – "Never Seen"). Unbeknownst to Alfred, late at night Sarah is serenaded by a mysterious stranger, who promises her eternal life and power (Gott ist tot, – God is Dead").

The next morning, the Professor bears witness to a small business exchange between Chagal and Koukol, a hideous hunchback living somewhere in the woods (Alles ist hell – "Everything's Bright"). He inquires about the odd man (Wahrheit – "truth"), but Chagal refuses to discuss the matter. That same night, Sarah tricks Alfred into giving up his bath for her ("Du bist wirklich sehr nett – "You're Really Very Nice") and as she joyfully soaps her sponge, Count von Krolock, an aristocratic vampire, breaks into the bathroom from the roof above and invites her to a midnight ball at his castle ("Einladung zum Ball – "Invitation to the Ball"). He is about to bite the girl, but Alfred, who has been spying on Sarah's bathing ritual, screams for help. Chagal and Rebecca arrive, furious. Sarah's father spanks her and forbids her to ever go outside.

However, later that night, Koukol arrives by the inn and leaves a red bundle for Sarah on the doorstep. She sneaks outside and discovers it to be a pair of expensive red boots. Alfred comes outside as well and professes his love to her (Draußen ist Freiheit – "Outside is Freedom"). The two plans on running off together and Sarah asks Alfred to go back into the house to fetch her sponge. With Alfred gone, Sarah fantasizes about the fantastical, romantic vampire ball she could be missing and decides to accept the Count's invitation (Stärker als wir sind – "Stronger Than We Are"). She runs off into the woods. Alfred starts to panic, Chagal and Rebecca rush outside, but it's too late and Sarah's gone. Chagal wraps himself in garlic and runs into the woods after his daughter.

The next morning, Chagal's frozen body is found; Rebecca is devastated (Trauer um Chagal – "Mourning for Chagal"). Professor Abronsius discovers small puncture wounds all over the body, but the villagers, still in denial, incorrectly assume they came from wolf bites. The Professor hands Rebecca a wooden stake and explains she must puncture Chagal's heart in order to prevent him from becoming a vampire. Hysterical, Rebecca chases him and Alfred out of the room, covering her husband with a bed sheet and swearing that she would never let anyone violate his corpse.

In the middle of the night, Magda sneaks downstairs to look at Chagal's corpse, expressing mixed feelings about his death (Tot zu sein ist komisch - "To be Dead is Strange"). Suddenly, Chagal sits up, now a vampire. Magda tries to fend him off with a crucifix, but being a Jewish vampire, he manages to overpower her and feed on her blood, killing her in the process. Alfred and the Professor sneak into the room as well, planning to stake Chagal, but they find Magda's body there instead. A chase ensues and the two finally corner Chagal, who begs for mercy and promises to show them the route to the vampire's castle where his daughter supposedly is held if he's spared.

Chagal leads the two heroes to a giant castle in the woods (Durch die Wildnis zum Schloß – "Through the Wilderness to the Castle"), where they are greeted by the mysterious Count von Krolock and his flamboyant son Herbert, who is instantly attracted to Alfred (Vor dem Schloß – "In Front of the Castle"). Von Krolock invites the two men into his domain and the two reluctantly accept his invitation.

Act II
Sarah is indeed at Count von Krolock's castle, wandering the dark empty halls and considering what her relationship with the Count truly is. The Count appears to welcome her and manages to resist biting her, planning to save her for the ball the next night (Totale Finsternis – "Total Eclipse"). At the same time, Alfred is asleep with the Professor in a guest bedroom in another part of the castle, suffering from terrifying nightmares, with one nightmare, in which he loses Sarah to the bloodthirsty vampires (Carpe noctem - "Seize the Night").

The next morning, Alfred wants to find Sarah and flee the castle (Ein perfekter Tag / Für Sarah – "A Perfect Day/For Sarah"), but Professor Abronsius is more concerned with staking Von Krolock and Herbert. Alfred and the Professor make their way to the crypt (In der Gruft – "In the Crypt"), where they locate the two vampires. The Professor becomes stuck on a banister as he attempts to get into the crypt and assigns Alfred to kill von Krolock and his son, but Alfred can't bring himself to drive a stake through their hearts. Before the Professor can think of something else, he hears a noise and the hapless duo flee the crypt just as Chagal arrives with Magda's coffin. Magda climbs out, now a vampire, and finally concedes to having a sexual relationship with Chagal.

Alfred and the Professor continue searching the castle and separate in the library (Bücher, Bücher – "Books, Books"). Alfred comes across a small bedroom where he finds Sarah in the bathroom, apparently unharmed. Alfred begs for her to leave, but Sarah refuses, saying she wants to stay for the midnight ball. She coaxes Alfred to leave the room (involving another encounter in the library, Noch mehr Bücher – "Even More Books") while she gets dressed, but when Alfred returns, Sarah is gone, and Herbert is in her place. Herbert tries flirting with the confused and terrified "hero" (Wenn Liebe in dir Ist – "When Love is Inside You"), which culminates with him lunging at Alfred's neck, but the Professor comes in the nick of time and hits the young vampire with an umbrella.

As Alfred and the Professor make it outside, the sun sets and they are confronted by von Krolock, who mocks the Professor's naive attempt to destroy him (Sie irren, Professor – "You're Wrong, Professor"). To their horror, the two watch a whole mob of vampires rise up from a nearby church yard and head towards the ballroom (Ewigkeit – "Eternity"). As the vampires leave their resting places, von Krolock reflects on his painful damnation as a member of the undead (Die unstillbare Gier – "The Insatiable Greed"), which Alfred overhears, but the Professor dismisses von Krolock as nothing more than a monster.

The vampires arrive in the castle and the ball begins (Tanzsaal – "The Dance Hall"). Alfred and Professor Abronisus sneak their way inside dressed as members of the undead. Count von Krolock appears at the top of the stairs to introduce his "guest," whom he forbids the other vampires to touch. Sarah enters the ballroom in an elegant red ballgown and approaches von Krolock. He is quick to embrace her with a bite, draining her blood. The Count then proceeds to dance with the weakened Sarah as the other vampires join them in a menuet. Alfred and the Professor plan to sneak Sarah out during the dance, but unfortunately for them, a mirror is unveiled, blowing their cover since they're the only ones reflected. Von Krolock commands his vampire flock to attack Alfred and his mentor, but the former manages to form a makeshift cross out of two candelabras, causing a diversion. The three humans make their escape as von Krolock, furious, sends Koukol chasing after the girl.

Koukol chases Alfred, Sarah and the Professor through the woods, but is attacked by wolves and killed. The three heroes stop on a small hillside to rest. Alfred once more professes his love to Sarah and the two lovers embrace (Draußen ist Freiheit – Reprise – "Outside is Freedom (Reprise)"). However, Sarah is already turned and bites Alfred mid-song, turning him into a vampire as well and both of them flee into the woods. Professor Abronsius, too consumed by his note taking, does not see what is happening behind him, until it is too late. In the epilogue, all vampires rejoice in their eternal dance (Der Tanz der Vampire – "Dance of the Vampires").

Productions

Austria
 originally was played from October 4, 1997, to January 15, 2000, at the Raimund Theater in Vienna, Austria. Steve Barton received the 1998 IMAGE Award for Best Actor for his originating performance as Count von Krolock. A complete cast recording and a highlights cast recording of the Vienna production was released on a double CD in 1998. For the tenth anniversary of the musical,  returned to the Raimund Theater for the week of February 3–11, 2007 in a scaled-down concert version.

From September 16, 2009, to June 25, 2011,  returned to Vienna at the Ronacher. The Ronacher production does not replicate the original. It features new sets, costumes, and lighting. Sets and costumes for the 2009 production were developed by Kentaur, based on the designs he developed previously for the Budapest production (see below).

Germany
The show had its German premiere in Stuttgart, Germany at the Apollo Theater and ran from March 31, 2000, to August 31, 2003. It had also played in Hamburg at the Neue Flora Theater from December 7, 2003, to January 22, 2006, in Berlin at the Theater des Westens from December 10, 2006, to March 30, 2008, and in Oberhausen at the Metronom Theater am Centro from November 7, 2008, to January 31, 2010. As a result of a public voting,  returned to Stuttgart at the Palladium Theater from February 25, 2010, to October 16, 2011. The show returned to the Theater des Westens in Berlin from November 14, 2011, to August 25, 2013. On April 24, 2016, Tanz der Vampire began a touring production across Germany that concluded on March 17, 2019.

United States

Pre-opening
Composer Steinman was no stranger to the theater scene in New York, having spent five years under the professional wing of New York Shakespeare Festival founder Joseph Papp in the early seventies and authored several musicals, including The Dream Engine, Neverland and The Confidence Man, and also provided the lyrics for Andrew Lloyd Webber's musical Whistle Down the Wind. After briefly considering a West End run, under the influence of Steinman and his manager David Sonenberg, it was decided to bring the musical (now titled Dance of the Vampires) to New York for the 1998 season, with Steinman translating and reshaping the German book and lyrics, Polanski returning as director, and original Viennese producer/Polanski manager Andrew Braunsberg serving as executive producer. Efforts to return Polanski to the United States proved fruitless, leading first to postponing the show's opening to Halloween 2000, and then to the decision (dated to roughly March 2000) to seek a different director if Polanski would not return.

In October 2000, a tentative fall 2001 opening was announced, along with the declaration that Steinman himself would serve as the show's director, despite never having directed for the stage. Attempting to reassure doubters, Steinman asserted in interviews that "Half the show [in Vienna] I had to talk Polanski into doing, and did it behind his back a lot. He's a great guy but he had a totally different vision". As early 2001 approached, however, and a reading for potential producers and investors was announced in the news section of Steinman's fan website, things began taking on a more concrete shape. John Caird was to co-direct, and comedic playwright David Ives was helping to reconfigure the book with a view toward a more comic angle instead of a straightforward adaptation of the successful Austrian version, which was deemed to be written in a style no longer accepted by Broadway critics and audiences. As Steinman later put it, looking back with a more jaundiced eye, "We were told to put five jokes on every page".  Signing on as producers were Sonenberg and the producing team of Elizabeth Williams and Anita Waxman, then known for the critically acclaimed revival of The Music Man.

The new version, described by Steinman to the press as "a big, Wagnerian musical with lots of humor [...] a lot of it is pure Mel Brooks and a lot of it Anne Rice" and to the by-invitation-only audience as a musical for "people who think musicals suck," was met with a mixed reception. Potential investors and producers seemed to love the score, but felt the new book with its mix of bawdy humor and eroticism needed fine-tuning. Unfortunately, Steinman's creative disagreements with his producing team (at one point telling the press "I can't tell you how many things are the opposite of what I want, but I am part of a team"), and their seeming inability to raise the investment money in time for a now-rather-unrealistic fall opening, led to tense situations backstage. Finally, Waxman and Williams were ousted from the production, with Sonenberg assuming day-to-day responsibilities as the lead producer, a strategic move viewed by many as a power grab on Steinman's part (as one source put it, "he has the final say on everything").

Casting Crawford, 9/11, and other disasters
At this point, the show needed some kind of drawing card to attract investors scared off by the previous snafus on the producing front. It was decided that a star lead in the role of Count von Krolock would be just the trick; feelers were put out to names as diverse as David Bowie, John Travolta, Richard Gere and Plácido Domingo. Ultimately, the team came to an agreement with Michael Crawford, best known on Broadway at the time as the lead in Andrew Lloyd Webber's The Phantom of the Opera in the 1980s. Steinman was reportedly elated, calling him "a towering talent" and "probably the biggest box-office star in the theater."  However, Crawford wanted some assurances before he would take on a planned three years in the role. He demanded complete creative control of his character, he wanted a "retirement package" of up to £20m a year ($180,000 a week in American money), and he also preferred to have "first refusal" on (i.e., the option to reprise) the role in London and Los Angeles. Additionally, though not a major point in negotiations, Crawford also sought assurance that he would receive the role of von Krolock in any resulting film version, having recently lost the film role of the Phantom to initial star Antonio Banderas (later replaced by Gerard Butler).  Of the four points of negotiation, Crawford won two, creative control and first refusal, eschewing the original salary (after initial press reports caused an outcry over his massive payday) for a much slimmer $30,000 a week. While Steinman, still ebullient over Crawford's casting, defended the original figure by saying Crawford "would be worth every cent we can pay him", a more sensible Crawford claimed that initial reports of a $180,000 salary were "ridiculous" and "a piece of fantasy journalism from my home country," adding that "anyone who knows how many people you can fit in a theater knows that you don't do Broadway to make money". The possibility of the film role, meanwhile, was never mentioned again.

By the time an official deal with Crawford was announced, by now downgraded to a yearlong contract in the role rather than three, he had been pulling his weight in the creative control department; as Sonenberg put it, "[He has been] working with us the last several months on input on the book." Crawford's agent Mort Viner reported that the role would not be a repeat of his Phantom performance "because of the comedy." Indeed, Crawford was involved in reshaping the role of von Krolock in a more comic fashion, insisting that the role as written was too close to the Phantom. Later reports would claim that Crawford, paranoid about doing anything that could be compared to the Phantom, agreed with the party line that the piece should be a comedy on the lines of Mel Brooks and that he personally revised and rearranged the book to that end, causing co-librettist Ives to remark that he was a stenographer rather than a writer, but in truth, the show already exhibited signs of much larger changes of a similar fashion as far back as the workshop production in mid-May 2001 before Crawford's casting; it seems that Crawford's major contributions at this time were in the vein of a "Continental accent" (a bizarre mix of Italian and Cockney tones that Crawford claimed made singing the score easier) and input on costume designs aimed at hiding alleged weight problems (jowls in particular). After rehearsals were to begin in January, the opening was set for April 2002 following six weeks of previews starting in March. Further casting sessions for secondary leads and ensemble were set for September 2001.

As a consequence of the September 11 attacks, however, the game-plan changed significantly. With most of the show's major creative team (including co-director Caird) based in London, a myriad of logistic delays were caused by mass cancellation of flights, among other variables. Realizing there was no way to open before the Tony cut-off as planned, and (it later emerged) unable to raise his share of the investment on time, Sonenberg publicly announced the postponement of the show's opening to October 24.

Previews to opening
Having postponed the show, the team sought to bring in additional producers who could help get the show in on time. Finally, USA Ostar Theatricals (headed by Barry Diller and Bill Haber), of the revival of Noises Off, Bob Boyett (producer of a revival of Hedda Gabler and investor in a revival of The Crucible and original productions Sweet Smell of Success and Topdog/Underdog), and Lawrence Horowitz (producer of Electra and It Ain't Nothin' But the Blues) signed on. A creative team was also finally being assembled, including set designer David Gallo, whom Steinman liked because Gallo told him upon meeting for the first time that he was probably the only set designer in America who still subscribed to Heavy Metal Magazine, and that he bought Bat Out of Hell because he saw the album cover artwork (conceived by Steinman and executed by Richard Corben) and decided he had to have it before he even heard the music. On a perhaps slightly less delightful note for Steinman, due to delays caused by Caird's long-distance habitation, and a desire on the part of the new producers to see names experienced with quirky comedies at the helm, he found himself and Caird replaced as directors by John Rando of Urinetown fame, who was quickly joined by choreographer John Carrafa, his co-helmer on Urinetown.

A cast also rapidly shaped up around Crawford with the input of the new director and choreographer in a fresh set of auditions, with then-ingenues Mandy Gonzalez and Max von Essen in the young lead roles of Sarah and Alfred, René Auberjonois (after similar prolonged negotiations to Crawford's) as Professor Abronsius, Ron Orbach (late of the out-of-town run of The Producers) as Chagal, and Leah Hocking as Magda, among others

On paper, put together by talented people, Dance of the Vampires looked like magic. A celebrated rock composer, a critics' darling who had authored several Off-Broadway plays, a Tony Award-winning director, and a high-wattage Broadway star were the captains of this ship. However, rehearsals proved just how unsteady the ship actually was.

Rando had never directed a musical of this size, and quickly proved overwhelmed according to cast members. Choreographer Carrafa wasn't helping; his idea of staging a big dance number was to tell the performers, "Just rock on!" Company morale was no better, as cast members began poking fun at Crawford's weight-sensitive costumes behind his back, calling him a "fat rooster." Crawford himself was no angel either; co-author Michael Kunze attested after the fact that Crawford "reject[ed] any well-meant suggestions for change by saying 'I don't wanna talk about it anymore.'" Indeed, Kunze, the original author of the German work, had much to complain about when it came to changes, but most of all that there was no "final moment" where one concept for the production was crystallized, partly because the director didn't seem "able to decide what was good or bad about both Jim Steinman's and Michael Crawford's ideas." Adding to the lack of a definitive creative head was the director's unplanned absence, due to his mother's death, which sidelined Rando from the production during several weeks of previews.  Steinman proved to have a bad attitude about the process; although publicly he put on a brave face for the press preview and for most interviews, he later claimed he could see what was wrong with the show, which he dubbed "a runaway train": "We ended up with two shows at war with each other. One was sensual and Gothic, the other was camp Rocky Horror. I knew the critics would kill us for that. We were the perfect target, a fat lady with a sign on her back that said, 'Kick me!'" However, unable to express his opinions without fighting with Crawford or the rest of the team (to the point that sharp- and quick-witted Steinman was viewed as verbally abusive by certain cast members), he opted instead to stop coming to the theater regularly, according to his account. It later emerged that in truth, presumably for his inactivity if Steinman's account is believable, Steinman was fired from the show by his own manager, acting as producer. Similarly, citing Sonenberg's inability to come up with his share of the investment, Steinman managed to get Sonenberg thrown overboard as a producer; the two did not speak for some time after the mutual firing. At about the same time, some cast members left the show, sensing that all was not well.

The show finally started previews after technological and creative delays at the Minskoff Theatre on October 18, 2002. Initially, the seemingly final result was an altered version with a lot of campy humor that differed considerably from the original show. Although the show initially went well in sales based on Crawford's name (for a time, the show played to packed houses in previews, and was in fourth place in terms of high-selling Broadway grosses without even having officially opened), the humor received some laughter and much criticism.

An attempt was made at arriving at a comfortable middle between the "two shows at war with each other," and original author Kunze was finally consulted for his opinion of what should be changed (far too late, in his view). Ultimately, thanks ironically to the German author of the original piece, the show arrived at much of its final form: during previews, 30% of the dialogue was cut to allow room to expand the score and arrive closer to the original almost sung-through concept; the vampire costumes were redesigned to look less freakish; a new staging of the shock ending set in modern times suggested by Kunze was inputted. Other suggestions, such as cutting a new dramatic death scene for the Count and restoring some of the original German lyrics, met with more dissension, and Kunze withdrew those suggestions, not wishing to cause any trouble. On a lighter note, entertainment mogul Howard Stringer, a friend of Crawford's, rang the final death knell for the weight-hiding costumes by telling Crawford he looked silly; from that point forward, the ruffled collars were gone.

Those major changes aside, the show seen in previews was still in flux, and a show that changed huge amounts of its material nightly, which caused some trouble with the cast. Crawford was regularly changing his dialogue and inserting his own jokes, testing the strength of the material, to the point that co-star René Auberjonois became paranoid about all of his jokes being cut, and the two of them began trying to step on each other's punchlines. By the time of opening, however, this mutual tomfoolery seemed to have been reined in; producer Bob Boyett had no complaints about Crawford's behavior, calling him "a great star and a total professional" and saying that he "didn't find him to be difficult at all." Another unfortunate side-effect of the changing material was that with Steinman out of the picture, there was no one around to write new lyrical material as necessary in some cases, and so the English version (of necessity) borrowed a lot of new material from Steinman's lyrics for the previous English versions of what songs were recycled in the show (see song list below).

Opening
After a prolonged period of development (61 previews in total, with two of the originally set opening dates missed), the English version of Dance of the Vampires opened on Broadway on December 9, 2002. Music and lyrics for the English version were officially credited to Jim Steinman, and the English book was officially credited to Jim Steinman, Michael Kunze and David Ives. This version of the show was critically lambasted; the work of lead performer Michael Crawford was reviewed particularly harshly. When the reviews came out, Steinman made a show of his disapproval of the project by not attending the opening night and publicly distancing himself from the show that had resulted from this "too many cooks" approach: "The show that I wrote is not at the Minskoff. The show that is dear to me is still running in Vienna. The one at the Minskoff was just a job." In later days, on his blog, he would still deny responsibility for what had occurred, writing that "DOTV as we know was UTTER SHIT!" in one post, and describing the production as a "shit pile" in another. He stated in other blog entries that his music was "wasted" on the show, and was careful to make a clear distinction between the Broadway version (referred to as DOTV) and the successful European version (referred to as Tanz).

On January 25, 2003, after 56 performances, Dance of the Vampires closed. According to The New York Times, it was "one of the costliest failures in Broadway history", losing roughly $12 million, easily eclipsing the infamous musical Carrie.

Original Broadway Cast
 Count Giovanni Von Krolock – Michael Crawford
 Sarah – Mandy Gonzalez
 Professor Abronsius – René Auberjonois
 Alfred – Max von Essen
 Chagal – Ron Orbach
 Magda – Leah Hocking
 Rebecca – Liz McCartney
 Herbert – Asa Somers
 Boris – Mark Price
 Zsa-Zsa – Erin Leigh Peck
 Nadja – E. Alyssa Claar

Other international productions
The musical has thus far been played at the following international venues:

 Estonia: Tallinn: 2000 at the Tallinna Linnahall
 Poland: Warsaw: October 8, 2005 – October 24, 2006 at the Roma Teatr Muzyczny
 Japan:
 Tokyo: July 7 – August 27, 2006; July 5 – August 26, 2009; November 27 – December 24, 2011; November 3–30, 2015; all at the Imperial Theater
 Fukuoka: September 2–27, 2009 at the Hakata-za Theater
 Osaka: January 7–12, 2012; January 2–11, 2016; all at the Umeda Arts Theater
 Nagoya: January 15–17, 2016 at Chunichi Theater
 Hungary: Budapest: June 30, 2007 at the Magyar Theater
 Belgium: Antwerp: September 9, 2010 – October 24, 2010 at the Stadsshouwburg Theater
 Slovakia: Nitra: May 5–7, 2011 at the Altes Theater Nitra
 Russia:
 Saint Petersburg: September 3, 2011 – July 31, 2014; August 22 – October 2, 2016; May 25, 2018 – July 21, 2019; all at the State Theater of Musical Comedy
 Moscow: October 29, 2016 – July 1, 2017 at the MDM Theater
 Finland:
 Seinäjoki: September 10, 2011 – March 24, 2012 at the Seinäjoki City Theatre
 Helsinki: February 3, 2016 – 2016 at the Peacock Theater
 France: Paris: October 16, 2014 – June 28, 2015 at the Theater Mogador
 Czech Republic: Prague: February 12, 2017 – June 10, 2018 at the GoJa Music Hall
 Switzerland: St. Gallen: February 19, 2017 at the Theater St. Gallen
 Denmark: Copenhagen: January 23 – April 9, 2020 at the Det Ny Teater

Characters 
(Note: Many changes in characterization were made for the Broadway version. This refers to the original European version.)
Graf von Krolock, the powerful and seductive vampire lord.
Professor Abronsius, an absent-minded vampire hunter.
Alfred, Abronsius' young and well-meaning assistant.
Sarah, the innkeeper's beautiful young daughter.
Chagal, a Jewish innkeeper and Sarah's over-protective father.
Rebecca, Chagal's long-suffering wife.
Magda, the pretty maid-of-all trades at Chagal's inn.
Herbert von Krolock, the Count's homosexual son.
Koukol, the Count's hunchbacked servant.

Songs 
The musical score written by Steinman leans heavily on material from his earlier projects, mainly from his less-known shows like The Dream Engine and The Confidence Man (co-written with Ray Errol Fox), although it also features music from his widely known records like "Total Eclipse of the Heart" (remade as "Totale Finsternis"), the melody, but not the lyric, from a Bat Out of Hell II song called "Objects in the Rear View Mirror May Appear Closer than They Are" (remade as "Die unstillbare Gier") and "Original Sin", originally written for the Pandora's Box album of the same name and later sung by Meat Loaf in Welcome to the Neighborhood (parts of which were remade as "Gott ist Tot" and "Einladung zum Ball"). The song "Tonight Is What It Means to Be Young" from the soundtrack to the film Streets of Fire was also used (remade as "Der Tanz der Vampire").

Asked at one point to explain the reuse of "Total Eclipse", Steinman explained, "That was an accident almost. I'm surprised it stayed in. [For the original production] in Vienna, I had only a month and a half to write this whole show and we needed a big love duet... But with Total Eclipse of the Heart, I was trying to come up with a love song and I remembered I actually wrote that to be a vampire love song. Its original title was Vampires in Love because I was working on a musical of Nosferatu, the other great vampire story. If anyone listens to the lyrics, they're really like vampire lines. It's all about the darkness, the power of darkness and love's place in dark. And so I figured 'Who's ever going to know; it's Vienna!' And then it was just hard to take it out."

Asked about the impact of previously heard songs, especially Total Eclipse, on the show's popularity in Europe, Steinman replied, "Well, the reaction, at least in Europe, was great. They recognized it, but then it seems – if it's done well – to take on a different personality."

Original Austrian version (1997) 
This song list also reflects the Japanese production in 2006.

Act One
 "Ouverture" (Overture)
 "He, Ho, He" (Hey, Ho, Hey)
 "Knoblauch" (Garlic)
 "Bitte, meine Herren" (Please, Gentlemen)
 "Eine schöne Tochter ist ein Segen" (A Beautiful Daughter Is a Blessing)
 "Nie geseh'n" (Never Seen)
 "Gott ist tot" (God Is Dead)
 "Alles ist hell" (Everything's Bright)
 "Wahrheit" (Truth)
 "Du bist wirklich sehr nett" (You're Really Very Nice)
 "Einladung zum Ball" (Invitation to the Ball)
 "Draußen ist Freiheit" (Outside Is Freedom)
 "Die roten Stiefel" (The Red Boots)
 "Trauer um Chagal" (Mourning for Chagal)
 "Tot zu sein ist komisch" (To Be Dead Is Strange)
 "Durch die Wildnis zum Schloß" (Through the Wilderness to the Castle)
 "Vor dem Schloß" (In Front of the Castle)

Act Two
 "Totale Finsternis" (Total Eclipse)
 "Carpe noctem" (Seize the Night)
 "Ein perfekter Tag" (A Perfect Day)
 "In der Gruft" (In the Crypt)
 "Bücher, Bücher" (Books, Books)
 "Für Sarah" (For Sarah)
 "Noch mehr Bücher" (Even More Books)
 "Wenn Liebe in dir Ist" (When Love Is Inside You)
 "Sie irren, Professor" (You're Wrong, Professor)
 "Ewigkeit" (Eternity)
 "Die unstillbare Gier" (The Insatiable Greed)
 "Tanzsaal" (The Ballroom)
 "Draußen ist Freiheit – Reprise"
 "Der Tanz der Vampire" (The Dance of the Vampires)

Later European versions 
While some song titles changed in later variations, aside from the addition of one number to replace Die roten Stiefel, the substance of the score is largely the same. (For example, the new title of Nie geseh'n merely reflects the first line of the song replacing its original title, not a new number being written. English translations of the new German phrases are provided as above, the exception being Wuscha Buscha, which is a nonsense phrase repeated in the peasant scenes in question.) The list below reflects changes made to all productions after the Stuttgart and Berlin runs. A few scenes have also been revised with shorter songs and less underscoring in order to pick up the pace of the show.

Act One
 "Ouverture"
 "He, Ho Professor"
 "Knoblauch"
 "Bitte, meine Herren!"
 "Eine schöne Tochter"
 "Ein Mädchen, das so lächeln kann" (A Girl Who Smiles in Such a Way)
 "Sei bereit (Gott ist tot)" (Be Prepared)
 "Alles ist hell"
 "Wahrheit"
 "Du bist wirklich sehr nett"
 "Einladung zum Ball"
 "Draußen ist Freiheit"
 "Stärker als wir sind" (Stronger Than We Are)
 "Wuscha Buscha"
 "Tot zu sein ist komisch"
 "Durch die Wildnis zum Schloß"
 "Vor dem Schloß"

Act Two
 "Liebesduett / Totale Finsternis" (Love Duet)
 "Carpe noctem"
 "Ein guter Tag" (A Good Day)
 "Für Sarah"
 "Die Gruft" (The Crypt)
 "Bücher"
 "Bücher – Reprise"
 "Wenn Liebe in dir Ist"
 "He Ho, Professor – Reprise"
 "Ewigkeit"
 "Die unstillbare Gier"
 "Tanzsaal"
 "Draußen ist Freiheit – Reprise"
 "Der Tanz der Vampire"

Original Broadway version (2002-03)

Previews version

Act One
 "Overture"
 "Angels Arise"
 "God Has Left the Building"
 "Original Sin"
 "Garlic"
 "Logic"
 "There's Never Been a Night Like This"
 "Don't Leave Daddy"
 "The Invitation"
 "A Good Nightmare Comes So Rarely"
 "The Devil May Care (But I Don't)"
 "Sometimes We Need the Boogeyman"
 "Death Is Such an Odd Thing"
 "Braver Than We Are"
 "Red Boots Ballet"
 "Say a Prayer"
 "Come with Me"

Act Two
 "Vampires in Love (Total Eclipse of the Heart)"
 "Books, Books"
 "Carpe Noctem"
 "For Sarah"
 "Something to Kill (Our Time)"
 "Death Is Such an Odd Thing – Reprise"
 "When Love Is Inside You"
 "Eternity"
 "Confession of a Vampire"
 The Ball
 "The Minuet"
 "Never Be Enough"
 "Read My Apocalypse"
 "Braver Than We Are – Reprise"
 "The Dance of the Vampires"

Final version

Act One
 "Overture"
 "Angels Arise" – Sarah, Nadja, Zsa Zsa 
 "God Has Left the Building" – Vampires and Sarah, Nadja, Zsa Zsa
 "Original Sin" – Count von Krolock, Sarah, Vampires
 "Garlic" – Chagal, Rebecca, Magda, Boris and the Peasants
 "Logic" – Abronsius, with Alfred, Chagal, Magda, and Rebecca
 "There's Never Been a Night Like This" – Alfred, Sarah, Chagal, Rebecca, Magda and Abronsius
 "Don't Leave Daddy" – Chagal
 "The Invitation" – Instrumental 
 "A Good Nightmare Comes So Rarely" – Krolock
 "Forevermore in the Night" – Instrumental 
 "Death Is Such an Odd Thing" – Rebecca, Magda
 "Braver Than We Are" – Sarah, Alfred
 "Red Boots Ballet" – Sarah, Company, Krolock
 "Say a Prayer" – Company
 "Come with Me" – Krolock

Act Two
 "Vampires in Love (Total Eclipse of the Heart)" – Sarah, Krolock, Vampires
 "Books, Books" – Abronsius, Krolock
 "Carpe Noctem" – Company
 "For Sarah" – Alfred
 "Death Is Such an Odd Thing (Reprise)" – Rebecca, Magda, Chagal
 "When Love Is Inside You" – Alfred, Herbert
 "Eternity" – Vampires
 "Confession of a Vampire" – Krolock
 The Ball:
 "The Minuet" – Abronsius, Alfred, Herbert, Boris, and Vampires
 "Never Be Enough" – Krolock and Vampires
 "Come with Me (Reprise)" – Krolock
 "Braver Than We Are (Reprise)" – Sarah, Alfred
 "The Dance of the Vampires" – Company

See also
 Vereinigte Bühnen Wien (Vienna & St. Petersburg Production Company)
 Stage Entertainment (German & Moscow Production Company)
 Vampires Rock A UK musical based on Tanz der Vampire.

References

External links
Official website for the current German touring production 
Official website for Dance of the Vampires (Vámpírok bálja) in Hungary 
Official website for Dance of the Vampires (Vampyyrien tanssi) in Finland 
Official website for Dance of the Vampires (Бал Вампиров, Bal Vampirov) in Russia, St.Petersburg 
International Facebook page for the Finnish production
Dance of the Vampires in Germany 
 
 

Vampires in plays
Vampires in music
Rock operas
Musicals based on films
1997 musicals
Broadway musicals
Musicals by Michael Kunze
Sung-through musicals
Musicals by Jim Steinman
German musicals